Lengpui is a census town in Mamit district in the Indian state of Mizoram.

Demographics

As of the 2011 Census of India, Lengpui had a population of 3282. Males constitute 51% of the population and females 49%. Lengpui has an average literacy rate of 97.83%, higher than the state average of 91.33%: male literacy is 98.37%, and female literacy is 97.28%. In Lengpui, 15.6% of the population is under 6 years of age.

Economy
The main Economy of Lengpui is Agriculture, the other main big employers are Lengpui Airport. St. Xavier's College, Lengpui has started since 2017  and  National Institute of Technology Mizoram campus construction is in progress in  Lengpui . Krishi Vigyan Kendra or KVK (Farm Science Centre) of Mamit District is also located in the town.

References

Mamit
Cities and towns in Mamit district